Sheldon Leonard Berman (February 3, 1925 – September 1, 2017) was an American comedian, actor, writer, teacher, and lecturer.

In his comedic career, he was awarded three gold records and he won the first Grammy Award for a spoken comedy recording in 1959. He played Larry David's father on Curb Your Enthusiasm, a role for which he received a 2008 Emmy Award nomination.

Berman taught humor writing at the University of Southern California for more than 20 years.

Early life and education
Berman was born in Chicago, the son of Irene (née Marks) and Nathan Berman. He was Jewish. He had a younger brother, Ronald.

He served in the Navy during World War II. He then enrolled in Chicago's Goodman School of Drama at the Art Institute of Chicago (now at DePaul University) as a drama student. There he met fellow student Sarah Herman; they married in 1947. His acting career began with an acting company in Woodstock, Illinois. Leaving Woodstock in 1949, the couple made their way to New York City. He studied acting at the HB Studio. To make ends meet, Berman found employment as a social director, cab driver, speech teacher, assistant manager of a drug store, and a dance instructor at Arthur Murray Dance Studios.

Eventually, Berman found work as a sketch writer for The Steve Allen Plymouth Show.

Career

Early career
Berman began as a straight actor, receiving his training at the Goodman Theatre in Chicago, performing in stock companies in and around Chicago and New York City.

In the mid-1950s, he became a member of Chicago's Compass Players, which later evolved into The Second City. While performing improvised sketches with Compass, Berman began to develop solo pieces, often employing an imaginary telephone to take the place of an onstage partner.

Nightclubs and live performances
In 1957, Berman was hired as a comedian at Mister Kelly's in Chicago, which led to other nightclub bookings, and a recording contract with Verve Records. His comedy albums earned him three gold records and he won the first Grammy Award for a spoken comedy recording. Berman appeared on numerous television specials and all of the major variety shows of the day.

He starred on Broadway in A Family Affair and continued with stage work in The Odd Couple, Damn Yankees, Where's Charley?, Fiddler on the Roof, Two by Two, I'm Not Rappaport, La Cage aux Folles, The Prisoner of Second Avenue and Guys & Dolls.

Berman's voice was used as the inspiration for the voice of the Hanna-Barbera cartoon character Fibber Fox, performed by Daws Butler.

Television career
Berman portrayed the role of Mendel Sorkin in an episode of CBS's Rawhide ("The Peddler", 1962).

Berman also appeared fairly regularly as a panelist (and once as the "Mystery Guest") on the CBS game show What's My Line in the early and mid-1960s.

Berman performed both comedic and dramatic roles on television, including appearances on episodes of The Twilight Zone (both radio and TV versions), Bewitched, Peter Gunn, The Mary Tyler Moore Show, Adam-12, Emergency!, Brothers, Night Court, MacGyver, L.A. Law, Friends, Walker, Texas Ranger, The King of Queens, Grey's Anatomy, Boston Legal, Lizzie McGuire, Hannah Montana, CSI: NY and the revived Hawaii Five-0. He also had a recurring role on the short-lived sitcom Walter & Emily.

From 2002 to 2009, Berman appeared as Larry David's aged father on Curb Your Enthusiasm, a role for which he received a 2008 Emmy Award nomination.

Film career
Among Berman's film credits are Dementia (1955, with Shorty Rogers), The Best Man (1964, with Henry Fonda and Cliff Robertson), Divorce American Style (1967, with Dick Van Dyke and Debbie Reynolds), Every Home Should Have One (1970, with Marty Feldman), Beware! The Blob (1972, with Robert Walker Jr.), Rented Lips (1988, with Martin Mull and Robert Downey Jr.), Teen Witch (1989, with Robyn Lively and Zelda Rubinstein), The Last Producer (2000, with Burt Reynolds), Meet the Fockers (2004, with Robert De Niro and Ben Stiller), The Holiday (2006, with Cameron Diaz), and You Don't Mess with the Zohan (2008, with Adam Sandler).

Late career
For over 20 years, Berman was a lecturer (later lecturer emeritus) in humor writing in the Master of Professional Writing program at the University of Southern California. He was also a teacher for the Improv Olympics program.

Personal life
Berman married Sarah Herman on April 19, 1947. The two met while they were studying acting at Chicago's Goodman Theatre.

In the mid-1960s, Berman and wife Sarah adopted two children, son Joshua and daughter Rachel. The Bermans were planning Joshua's bar mitzvah when he was diagnosed with a brain tumor. Joshua died on October 29, 1977, at age 12.

Berman and his wife were supporters of the Motion Picture and Television Fund (located in Woodland Hills, California), a charitable organization that offers assistance and care to those in the motion picture and television industries with limited or no resources, and contributed their time and resources to benefit the facilities and the residents.

In the 1980s, the Chamber of Commerce in Canoga Park, California selected Berman to be one of the celebrities to serve a term as honorary mayor of Canoga Park.

Allegation of plagiarism
In a 2012 podcast interview with Marc Maron, Berman alleged that comedian Bob Newhart plagiarized his improvisational telephone routine style, describing its genesis and saying it was a "very special technique that couldn't really be imitated. It could be stolen. And it was." "I was coming to work at night and a guy stopped his car, passed me by, and said 'Hey, Shelley! There's a guy [who] stole your act!'" When asked by Maron if it was done maliciously, Berman replied, "Maliciously? He wouldn't do it maliciously. Nobody does that. But he did it to make a living. And he became a star."

When asked in interviews about the telephone issue, Newhart said:
Shelley Berman did it before I did it. Mike (Nichols) and Elaine (May) did a version of it. There was a thing called 'Cohen on the Telephone,' which was a very, very early recording by Edison [Records] of a guy on the phone....George Jessel had a radio show...At the end, he would call up his mother and tell her how the show had gone. As a kid growing up, I remember listening to him and he would call his mother up and say, 'Mama, this is Georgie'" – he paused, skillfully – "'from the money.'"

Death
Berman died from Alzheimer's disease-related complications at his home in Bell Canyon, California, in the early morning of September 1, 2017. He was 92 years old. His archive was donated to the National Comedy Center in Jamestown, New York.

Comedian Steve Martin praised Berman on Twitter, thanking him for "changing modern stand-up [comedy]". Marc Maron also tweeted "Shelley Berman has hung up the phone. RIP. The guy who inspired me to sit. Great comic."

Works
Film

Television

 Theatre

DiscographyInside Shelley Berman (1959) Outside Shelley Berman (1959)The Edge of Shelley Berman (1960)A Personal Appearance (1961)New Sides (1963)The Sex Life of The Primate (And Other Bits of Gossip) (1964)Let Me Tell You a Funny Story (1965)Live Again! Recorded at the Improv (1995)To Laughter with Questions (2013)When Jews Were Funny (2013)

BibliographyCleans and Dirtys (1966)A Hotel Is a Place ... (1972)Up in the Air With Shelley Berman (1986) To Laughter With Questions (2013)

Awards and nominations

References

External links
 
 Comprehensive Berman interview with Kliph Nesteroff
 
 
 
 
 Audio interview on The Sound of Young America'' (MP3 link)
 Shelley Berman Radio Interview WSLR
 

1925 births
2017 deaths
20th-century American comedians
21st-century American comedians
Jewish American male comedians
American male dramatists and playwrights
American dramatists and playwrights
American male film actors
American male poets
American male screenwriters
American stand-up comedians
American male television actors
Burials at Hillside Memorial Park Cemetery
Comedians from California
Comedians from Illinois
Deaths from Alzheimer's disease
Deaths from dementia in California
Grammy Award winners
Jewish American male actors
Jewish American dramatists and playwrights
Jewish American philanthropists
Jewish American screenwriters
Male actors from Chicago
People from Bell Canyon, California
People from Woodstock, Illinois
Philanthropists from Illinois
Screenwriters from California
Screenwriters from Illinois
University of Southern California faculty
Verve Records artists
Writers from Chicago
20th-century American philanthropists
United States Navy personnel of World War II
21st-century American Jews